Tilwada or tilwara is a tala of Hindustani music. Like tintaal, tilwada tala also has 16 beats. Tilwada is often used in Kheyal.

Arrangement
Cyclical series of equally periodical beats consisted of recurring claps and waves:
clap, 2, 3, 4, clap, 2, 3, 4, wave, 2, 3, 4, clap, 2, 3, 4
or counted out as:
clap, 2, 3, 4, clap, 6, 7, 8, wave, 10, 11, 12, clap 14, 15, 16

Theka
This tala has the following arrangement:

References

Hindustani talas